Tatjana Mannima (born 10 January 1980) is an Estonian cross-country skier. She represented Estonia in 2006, 2010 and 2018 Winter Olympics, she earned her best finish of 17th in the 4 × 5 km relay at Turin at 2006 while her best individual finish was 41st both in the individual sprint and 30 km events at those same games.

Mannima's best finish at the FIS Nordic World Ski Championships was 15th twice in the 4 × 5 km relay (2007, 2009) while her best individual finish was 41st in the 30 km event at Liberec in 2009.

Her best World Cup finish was tenth in the 4 × 5 km relay at Sweden in 2007 while her best individual finish was 25th in a 15 km mixed pursuit at those same event.

Cross-country skiing results
All results are sourced from the International Ski Federation (FIS).

Olympic Games

World Championships

World Cup

Season standings

References

External links

1980 births
Living people
People from Kiviõli
Cross-country skiers at the 2006 Winter Olympics
Cross-country skiers at the 2010 Winter Olympics
Cross-country skiers at the 2018 Winter Olympics
Estonian female cross-country skiers
Tour de Ski skiers
Olympic cross-country skiers of Estonia
21st-century Estonian women